9 Parachute Squadron RE (often abbreviated to '9 Sqn') is an airborne detachment of the Royal Engineers, part of the British Army. Like other units consisting of Royal Engineers, soldiers in the squadron are called sappers. It is part of the 23 Parachute Engineer Regiment based at Rock Barracks the airborne Royal Engineers unit.

History

Early history
Now based at Rock Barracks in Woodbridge, Suffolk with the rest of 23 Parachute Engineer Regiment, the squadron's history goes back to 1787, when the Chatham Company of "Royall Military Artificers" was raised at Chatham, which, in 1806, was numbered 9 Field Company in Gibraltar.

The next hundred years of the squadron's history is rather meagre, but it is known to have served in the Kaffir Wars, the Crimean War, Bermuda, Halifax, Nova Scotia and Hong Kong. It was under the command of the 7th Division during the Boer War. During the First World War the company served with the 4th Infantry Division, bridging the Rivers Marne and Aisne, as well as taking part in the Battle of the Somme.

Second World War
The outbreak of the Second World War in 1939 saw 9th Field Company RE in France once again, still as part of the 4th Division. It took part in the evacuation of the British Expeditionary Force from Dunkirk.

In May 1942, it was reorganised as 9 Field Company RE (Airborne). 9 Field Company RE (Airborne) became the engineer support for the newly formed 1st Air Landing Brigade, with about one third of the company being trained in the use of parachutes while the rest were trained as glider-borne troops.

The unit's first airborne operation was in Norway in 1942 when they were sent as Operation Freshman to destroy a heavy water plant. However, both gliders crash landed, and the few survivors were executed by the Gestapo. In 1943 9 Field Company RE (Airborne) also took part in further airborne operations in North Africa, Sicily and Italy.

Operation Market Garden
9 Field Company RE (Airborne) returned to the UK in November 1943 to prepare for D Day. In September 1944 the company took part in Operation Market Garden. With the exception of two gliders that crash landed, the remainder of the unit landed safely at Arnhem, where they played an important role in the defence of the bridge. The platoon was used as the counter-attack force by Lt Col John Frost, the Commanding Officer of 2nd Battalion The Parachute Regiment, and fought with great bravery in the infantry role. However, they took heavy casualties, with just 57 of the original company of 215 men returning to the UK, the rest being captured or killed.

Post Second World War
On VE Day, 1st Airborne Division was ordered to Norway to accept the surrender of the 400,000 German soldiers there. After VJ Day 9th Airborne Squadron went to Palestine with the 6th Airborne Division. The squadron had a difficult time in Palestine, being sent to clear the King David Hotel in Jerusalem after the horrific bomb attack. In Palestine the squadron lost three men killed in action.

9 Independent Airborne Squadron RE accompanied the division to Germany, returning to the UK in 1950, since when the squadron has served on active service in countries such as Egypt, Cyprus, Jordan, Kuwait, Bahrain, Aden, Radfan, Borneo, Rhodesia as well as six full tours and two spearhead tours of duty in Northern Ireland.

Falklands War 1982
In 1976, 16 Independent Parachute Brigade disbanded and 9 Independent Parachute Squadron RE lost its independence and became part of 36 Engineer Regiment, based at Maidstone. 9 Parachute Squadron RE, as it was now called, was to remain in Aldershot to support the Parachute Battalions. In April 1982, the squadron embarked for the Falkland Islands as part of 5 Infantry Brigade. In true sapper tradition, the squadron was involved in the thick of the action from clearing minefields to repairing bridges. Sergeant Ron Wrega, Sergeant Pete Colclough and Corporal John Foran won the Military Medal during the conflict.

Royal Guard
After the Falklands War, the squadron had tours in Belize, Kenya, the Falklands and Canada. In 1987, in the Royal Engineers 200th Anniversary Year, the squadron was selected to provide the Royal Guard. After six weeks of intense training, the squadron provided the guard for Buckingham Palace, St. James's Palace and for the Tower of London. They were also given the duty of guarding the Royal London Palaces in 2009, 21 years after first performing the task.

Rwanda
Between July and November 1994, the squadron served in Rwanda as part of the UNAMIR mission, for which it was jointly awarded the Wilkinson Sword of Peace. In Rwanda, the squadron contributed to the stabilising of the difficult situation and to the rebuilding of the country’s infrastructure. This was achieved by providing sterilised water, constructing roads and bridges (including the longest operationally constructed Bailey Bridge since the Second World War), providing support to medical and dental facilities, general artisan trade work and mine clearance.

Recent activities
In September 1998 the squadron was deployed to Bosnia, being involved in repairing, reinforcing and replacing camp structures. In June 1999, 100 soldiers from the squadron were deployed to Kosovo, where they were involved in the clearing and securing of the mountain corridor to Kaçanik to enable 4 Brigade to pass through. In addition, members of the squadron deployed on a UN mission to Cyprus.

Between April – October 2000, the squadron deployed on another tour to Northern Ireland, carrying out various tasks across the province and dismantling the famous golf towers of South Armagh.

In August 2001, the squadron deployed to the Republic of Macedonia as part of the Multi National Force on Operation BESSEMER. The main squadron task was in support of the weapons collection operation. Members of the squadron also provided the vital infrastructure required to sustain such an operation, as well as constructing extensive force protection measures. During the operation, Recce Troop, on their debut deployment, carried out vital route reconnaissance and with the assistance of geo technicians, produced mapping of routes throughout the country. During this operation, Sapper Ian Collins was killed by Macedonian youths.

December 2001 saw a very quick deployment to Afghanistan, having only just returned from Macedonia. The squadron had an integral part to play in the International Security Assistance Force on Operation FINGAL. The squadron, based out of Kabul, provided vital infrastructure and force protection in support of 2 PARA Battlegroup, as part of the Multi National Engineer Group.

Since 1976 the squadron had been under command of 36 Engineer Regiment, However, January 2003 saw the formation of 23 Engineer Regiment (Air Assault) and with it the command change of 9 Parachute Squadron to the new RHQ. The squadron currently serves as part of 23 Parachute Engineer Regiment in Woodbridge (Suffolk), the former RAF Woodbridge, and provides close engineer support to 16 Air Assault Brigade. The squadron remains the longest continually serving in-role fighting unit in Airborne Forces.

In 2011, the squadron returned home with the rest of 23 Parachute Engineer Regiment from its last tour of Afghanistan. The tasks of 12 (Nova Scotia) Headquarters and Support (Air Assault) Squadron were split across the remaining two Parachute Field Squadrons in the Regiment as it was placed in suspended animation until 2018 when it was reformed as 12 Parachute Headquarters and Support Squadron.

References

External links
Airborne Engineers Association
Official site
Unofficial site
History of 9 Para Sqn RE
9 Para Sqn RE on the Royal Engineers Museum website

9
Suez Crisis
Military units and formations of the United Kingdom in the Falklands War
Parachute Squadron RE, 09
1787 establishments in Great Britain
Military units and formations established in 1787